Hattie Carwell (born July 17, 1948) is an American physicist and former scientist with the United States Department of Energy and the International Atomic Energy Agency. In 1990, she became a program manager for high energy and nuclear programs with the DOE San Francisco Operations Office. She additionally was a lead operations engineer at the Berkeley Site Office in 1994-2006.

Biography and education 
Carwell was born July 17, 1948 in Brooklyn, NY. She grew up in Ashland, Virginia where she was encouraged by her community to become a scientist.  After graduating high school Hattie enrolled in Bennett College for Women in Greensboro, North Carolina in the fall of 1966.  She graduated from the college in 1970 with a bachelor's degree in chemistry. In the fall of 1970, Carwell was enrolled in Rutgers University where she earned a M.S. degree in health physics.

Career 
After graduating from Rutgers University, Hattie Carwell obtained a position with the U.S. Department of Energy and the International Atomic Energy Agency as a health physicist and nuclear safeguards group leader. She worked both nationally and internationally for the agency.  Carwell went on to work in Vienna, Austria where she served as a nuclear safeguards inspector and group leader at the International Atomic Energy Agency from 1980 to 1985.  In 1985, she moved to Oakland, California and worked with the Department of Energy as a program manager for high energy and nuclear programs. In 1990, Carwell became the program manager for high energy and nuclear program in the Department of Energy's San Francisco Operations office.  Later, Carwell became a senior facility operations engineer at Berkeley in 1992.  In 1994, she was promoted to operations lead, a position which she held until 2006.  She later became a senior physical scientist before retiring in 2008. In 2010, she attended a workshop organized by the National Academies of Science, Engineering, and Medicine titled "Chemistry in Primetime and Online: Communicating Chemistry in Informal Environments." In March 2020, she served on a panel about higher education leadership at the 50th Annual Conference of the Council of Historically Black Graduate Schools. She was an attendee at the 2014 National Academics of Science, Engineering, and Medicine workshop entitled Opportunities for the Gulf Research Program: Middle-Skilled Workforce Needs.

Writing 
Carwell has written two books and numerous articles.  One of her books is titled Blacks in Science: Astrophysicist to Zoologist.

Boards 
Carwell is a board member and served as President of the Northern California Council of Black Professional Engineers. She is a treasurer for the National Council of Black Engineers and Scientist, co-founder and chair of the Development Fund for Black Students in Science and Technology, and Co-founder and Executive Director of the Museum of African American Technology (MAAT) Science Village in Oakland, California. Carwell also serves as the Coordinator of the Coalition of Hispanic, African and Native Americans for the Next Generation of Engineers and Scientists (CHANGES).

Recognition 
Carwell has been recognized for her work with the Department of Energy, where she has received numerous awards.  She has also received awards for her work in community leadership.  She has received an award from her alma mater Bennett College where she is a distinguished alumnae.  Carwell is also noted in Who's Who in America. In 1991, Carwell was inducted into the National Black College Alumni Hall of Fame. Carwell is featured in the book Sisters in Science: Conversations with Black Women Scientists on Race, Gender, and Their Passion for Science by Diann Jordan. On February 18, 2020, Carwell was featured on a podcast episode on a University of Manitoba radio channel. She was recognized at the STEM Future Foundation's WE ALL WIN WITH STEM! Fundraiser and Awards Ceremony in 2018 with an Urban Superhero Award and Congressional Accommodation from Barbara Lee.

References

1948 births
Living people
Bennett College alumni
Rutgers University alumni
21st-century American physicists
People from Brooklyn
People from Ashland, Virginia
20th-century American physicists
Scientists from New York City
Scientists from Virginia
American women physicists
20th-century American women scientists
21st-century American women scientists
United States Department of Energy officials
20th-century African-American women
20th-century African-American scientists
21st-century African-American women
21st-century African-American scientists